Iain Benjamin King   is a British writer. King was appointed a Commander of the Order of the British Empire in the 2013 Birthday Honours, for services to governance in Libya, Afghanistan and Kosovo.
He is a Scholar at the Modern War Institute, United States Military Academy at West Point, and a former Fellow at the Center for Strategic and International Studies, and at Cambridge University.
 
After seven years work on the Northern Ireland peace process in the 1990s, Iain King held a senior political role in Kosovo’s UN Administration, and co-authored a book on the history of Kosovo and the difficulties of post-war state-building in the Balkans, called Peace at Any Price: How the World Failed Kosovo.

His 2008 book, How to Make Good Decisions and Be Right All the Time: Solving the Riddle of Right and Wrong, starts with a history of moral philosophy and then develops a hybrid methodology for ethical decision-making. King's approach has been described as quasi-utilitarian, and credited with reconciling competing systems of ethics.

Secrets of The Last Nazi, based on extensive research of the Nazi era, was King's debut novel, first published in 2015. A sequel followed in 2016.

Making Peace in War is about Afghanistan.

King has been featured as a foreign policy analyst on CNN and BBC, and has written for multiple outlets, many of them based in the US, including NBC, Defense One, Prospect, and National Interest.

Bibliography
 
 
King, Iain (2014). Making Peace in War. Amazon Media. 
King, Iain (2015). Secrets of The Last Nazi. Bookouture. 
King, Iain (2016). Last Prophecy of Rome. Bookouture.

References

External links
 "Moral Laws of the Jungle" (article in Philosophy Now magazine)
 "Thinkers At War" (history series on the military experiences of philosophers)
 Author's website

1971 births
21st-century English male writers
21st-century English novelists
21st-century English philosophers
Alumni of Pembroke College, Oxford
British ethicists
English male novelists
English social commentators
Commanders of the Order of the British Empire
Consequentialists
English novelists
Epistemologists
Living people
Metaphysicians
Ontologists
People from Gloucestershire
Philosophers of history
Philosophers of mind
Philosophy writers
Political philosophers
Social philosophers
Utilitarians